Between 23 March 2017 and 30 March 2021, 194 individuals served as representatives in House of Representatives, the 150-seat lower house of the States-General of the Netherlands. 150 members were elected in the 15 March 2017 general election, and 44 members were appointed as replacements as elected representatives resigned. Khadija Arib, who had been elected Speaker of the House in 2016, continued serving in that capacity for the duration of this period.

After the election, the Third Rutte cabinet was formed from a coalition of People's Party for Freedom and Democracy (VVD, 33 seats), Christian Democratic Appeal (CDA, 19 seats), Democrats 66 (D66, 19 seats) and Christian Union (CU, 5 seats).

The opposition consisted of Party for Freedom (PVV, 20 seats), GroenLinks (GL, 14 seats), Socialist Party (SP, 14 seats), Labour Party (PvdA, 9 seats), Party for the Animals (PvdD, 5 seats), 50PLUS (50+, 4 seats), Reformed Political Party (SGP, 3 seats), DENK (3 seats) and Forum for Democracy (FvD, 2 seats). 

During the term, three members switched their parliamentary group affiliation, changing the party composition of the House of Representatives. (Resignation do not affect the balance of power, as replacements are appointed by parties.) Wybren van Haga was removed from the VVD on 24 September 2019; he continued as an independent member and later joined FvD on 1 December 2020. Femke Merel van Kooten-Arissen left the PvdD on 16 July 2019 and continued as an independent. When Henk Krol left 50+ on 6 May 2020, he and Van Kooten-Arissen briefly formed a parliamentary group, but split on 8 August 2020.

Members 
All members are sworn in at the start of the term, even if they are not new. Assumed office in this list therefor refers to the swearing in during this term, while all members are automatically considered to have left office at the end of the term.

Notes

References 

 

2017-2021